Two ships of the Canadian navy have been named HMCS St. Croix.
  (I) was a  that was originally commissioned as  until transfer to the Royal Canadian Navy in 1940 by way of the Royal Navy.
  (II) was a  that served in the RCN from 1958 to unification in 1968 and thence in the Canadian Forces Maritime Command from 1968 until 1974.

Battle honours
 Atlantic 1940–43

Set index articles on ships
Royal Canadian Navy ship names